Les Aix-d’Angillon is a commune in the Cher department in the Centre-Val de Loire region of France.

Geography
The small rivers Colin and Quatier flow southward through the commune.

Population

Sights
 A sixteenth century hospice.
 The church of Notre-Dame, dating from the twelfth century.
 The church of St. Germain de Valentigny.
 Traces of the feudal castle.

See also
Communes of the Cher department

References

External links

Official website of Les Aix-d'Angillon 

Communes of Cher (department)